Bipin Jose is an Indian television actor who is known for playing the roles of Sreeraman in Seetha, Rishi in Koodevide and Amith in Kattappanayile Rithwik Roshan.

Filmography

Film

Television

References

External links
 
 

Living people
Male actors in Malayalam television
Male actors in Malayalam cinema
1987 births